Ġgantija ("Giantess") is a  megalithic temple complex from the Neolithic era (c. 3600–2500 BC), on the Mediterranean island of Gozo in Malta. The Ġgantija temples are the earliest of the Megalithic Temples of Malta and are older than the pyramids of Egypt. Their makers erected the two Ġgantija temples during the Neolithic  which makes these temples more than 5500 years old and the world's second oldest existing manmade religious structures after Göbekli Tepe in present-day Turkey. Together with other similar structures, these have been designated a UNESCO World Heritage Site, the Megalithic Temples of Malta.

The temples are elements of a ceremonial site in a fertility rite. Researchers have found that the numerous figurines and statues found on site are associated with that cult. According to local Gozitan folklore, a giantess who ate nothing but broad beans and honey bore a child from a man of the common people. With the child hanging from her shoulder, she built these temples and used them as places of worship.

Description and design 

The Ġgantija temples stand at the edge of the Xagħra plateau, facing toward the south-east. This megalithic monument encompasses two temples and an incomplete third, of which only the facade was partially built before being abandoned. Like Mnajdra South, it faces the equinox sunrise, built side by side and enclosed within a boundary wall. The southerly one is the larger and older one, dating back to approximately 3600 BC. It is also better preserved. The plan of the temple incorporates five large apses, with traces of the plaster that once covered the irregular wall still clinging between the blocks.

The temples are built in the typical clover-leaf shape, with inner-facing blocks marking the shape. The space between the walls was then filled in with rubble. A series of semi-circular apses is connected with a central passage. Archaeologists believe that the apses were originally covered by roofing.

The effort is a remarkable feat when considering the monuments were constructed when the wheel had not yet been introduced and no metal tools were available to the Maltese Islanders. Small, spherical stones have been discovered. They were used as ball bearings for the vehicles that transported the enormous stone blocks used for the temples.

The temple, like other megalithic sites in Malta, faces southeast. At the entrance sits a large stone block with a recess, which led to the hypothesis that this was a ritual ablution station for purification before worshippers entered the complex. The five apses contain various altars. Researchers have found animal bones on the site that suggest the space was used for animal sacrifice.

Excavations and recognition

Residents and travelers knew about the existence of the temple for a long time. In the late 18th century, before any excavations were carried out, Jean-Pierre Houël drew a plan based on that knowledge, which has been found to be highly accurate. In 1827 Col. John Otto Bayer, the Lieutenant Governor of Gozo, had the site cleared of debris. The soil and remains were lost without having been properly examined. German artist Charles Frederick de Brocktorff had painted a picture of the site within a year or two prior to the removal of the debris, so he made a record of the site before clearance.

After the excavations were conducted in 1827, the ruins fell into decay. The remains were included on the Antiquities List of 1925. The land was held privately until 1933, when the Government expropriated it for public benefit. The Museums Department conducted extensive archaeological work in 1933, 1936, 1949, 1956–57 and 1958–59. Its goal was to clear, preserve and research the ruins and their surroundings.

The Ġgantija temples were listed as a UNESCO World Heritage Site in 1980. In 1992, the Committee decided to expand the listing to include five other megalithic temples located across the islands of Malta and Gozo. The Ġgantija listing was renamed "the Megalithic Temples of Malta"

The temple and the surrounding areas were restored or rehabilitated in the 2000s. Lightweight walkways were installed in the temple in 2011, to protect the floor. A heritage park was developed and opened in 2013.

Contemporary interpretations 
Anthropologist Kathryn Rountree has explored how "Malta’s neolithic temples", including Ġgantija, "have been interpreted, contested and appropriated by different local and foreign interest groups: those working in the tourist industry, intellectuals and Maltese nationalists, hunters, archaeologists, artists, and participants in the global Goddess movement."

Reportedly, some Goddess tours refer to the two temples at Ġgantija "as the Mother & Daughter Temple."

Gallery

See also 
 Megalithic Temples of Malta
 Ħaġar Qim
 Hypogeum of Ħal-Saflieni
 List of megalithic sites
 Mnajdra
 Tarxien Temples

References

External links 

 National Inventory of the Cultural Property of the Maltese Islands
 Heritage Malta's Ġgantija page
 Ġgantija Temple on Google Maps

World Heritage Sites in Malta
Megalithic Temples of Malta
Neolithic sites
4th-millennium BC architecture
National Inventory of the Cultural Property of the Maltese Islands
Sites managed by Heritage Malta
Buildings and structures in Xagħra